Adam Livingstone (born 22 February 1998) is a Scottish footballer who plays as a left wing-back for AFC Telford United. He has previously played for Motherwell, East Fife, Greenock Morton, Cove Rangers, Clyde Stafford Rangers and Hednesford Town.

Career
On 16 May 2017, Livingstone made his debut for Motherwell as a substitute in a 3–1 victory against Kilmarnock. On 31 January 2018, Livingstone signed for East Fife on loan until the end of the 2017–18 season.

On 29 March 2019, Livingstone extended his contract with Motherwell until the summer of 2020. Livingstone moved on a season-long loan to Greenock Morton on 2 September 2019. He returned to Motherwell on 31 January 2020, his loan having been terminated early at Motherwell's request. On 4 February 2020, he was sent on loan again, to Clyde for the remainder of the season. On 31 May, Motherwell confirmed that Livingstone would be leaving the club after his contract expired.

Livingstone signed a two-year contract with Cove Rangers in August 2020.

He returned to Clyde in June 2021 for the season, where he won Player of the Year.

In the summer of 2022, Adam went down south to the English leagues to play for Stafford Rangers, Hednesford Town and AFC Telford United.

Career statistics

References

External links
 

1998 births
Living people
Scottish footballers
Association football defenders
Motherwell F.C. players
East Fife F.C. players
Greenock Morton F.C. players
Clyde F.C. players
Scottish Professional Football League players
Sportspeople from Wishaw
Cove Rangers F.C. players
Footballers from North Lanarkshire